is a Japanese cultural theme park  in the Kinugawa Onsen area of Nikkō, Tochigi. The park resurrects and showcases the life and culture of the Edo period.

Edo Wonderland spans a site area of 122.3 acres (49.5 hectares). The park's design is based on the Edo period's golden era known as Genroku. Edo Wonderland hosts a wide variety of Edo period architecture from rural lodgings to urban samurai residences and government buildings. It is populated by staff in Edo period attire, reenacting the speech and behaviour of Edo era citizens from lower, middle and upper classes. The park has seven theatres featuring traditionally themed shows including plays, ninja action and oiran shows combined with outdoor live shows, street performances, parades, seasonal festivals and special events. Edo Wonderland also has a range of visitor experiences for adults and children including ninja workshops, Japanese traditional archery and shuriken throwing.

You can dress up as an Edo Period character at Henshin Costume House then walk around in the costume and watch how the actors treat you as what you are dressed up as.

History
Edo Wonderland was established on April 23, 1986, in Fujiwara-cho, Shioya-gun, Tochigi Prefecture, in what is now known as the Nikko Kinugawa district. Three more parks were constructed in Hokkaido, Kanazawa and Mie prefectures, but they were sold in the 2000s.

Edo Wonderland Studio
Edo Wonderland contains film studios and a large open set often used for jidaigeki historical films and TV drama series, both domestic and international. The theme park itself, due to its unique atmosphere, is featured on domestic and international travel, culture and variety shows.

Mascot
The mascot of Edo Wonderland is Nyanmage, a samurai cat. Its name is derived from "nyan" (the sound a cat makes in Japanese, equivalent to "meow" English) and "mage", the topknot hairstyle.

Language support
As of 2014, printed park and timetable information is available in English, French, German, Thai, Korean, Russian, Simplified Chinese and Traditional Chinese. English speaking staff are available. Restaurant menus are available in English and Japanese.

Location
470-2 Karakura, Nikko, Tochigi, 321-2524 JAPAN

Use in Media
The park was used extensively during Downtown no Gaki no Tsukai ya Arahende!!'s 2013 New Year's Eve special.

On February 20, 2013- Visual Kei band 己龍(Kiryu) released their music video for 悦ト鬱(Etsu to Utsu). The music video was filmed in Nikko Edomura. (In the reference link provided below, their guitarist 九条武政 (Takemasa Kujou) states that this is where the music video was filmed.) Edo Wonderland's Studio 2's Castle Interior was used for the part of the music video that was filmed indoors. 

The film Pure Japanese, starring Dean Fujioka, was released on January 28, 2022. The film stars an action actor who works at the theme park Nikko Oedomura and was shot in Nikko Edomura in September 2020.

References

External links

 Edo Wonderland website
 Edo Wonderland Studio website
 Edo Wonderland Youtube Channel
 Tobu Kinugawa Theme Park Pass page

Amusement parks in Japan
1986 establishments in Japan
Museums established in 1986